Kanakombathu is a 2011 Malayalam thriller film written by Madhu Muttom and directed by debutant Mahadevan. The cast includes Manoj K. Jayan, Mythili, Deepu Shanth, Shankar Narayanan and Vinod Kishan in the lead roles. This was a disaster at the box office.

Cast
 Deepu Shanth as Balu Viswanath
 Shankar Narayanan as Sameer
Vinay Forrt as Jose Kurya
 Vinod Kishan
 Manoj K. Jayan as Sidharthan
 Mythili
 Vivek
 Urmila Unni
 Nedumudi Venu as Rtd.Col.T.Pappachen
 Jagathy Sreekumar as E.C Narayanankutty
 Suraj Venjaramoodu as Gopalakrishnan
 Kalasala Babu as K.Ramachandran Kurup
 K. P. A. C. Lalitha as Sarasamma
 Kalpana
 Jaffer Idukki
 P. Sreekumar as Gopy
 Ponnamma Babu
 Madhu Warrier
 Jose Thettayil MLA
 Aniyappan

References

2010s Malayalam-language films
2011 thriller films
2011 films
2011 directorial debut films
Indian thriller films